HMS Inflexible was a  designed by Sir William Symonds, Surveyor of the Navy. After commissioning she sailed for the East Indies and participated in the last year of the New Zealand War of 1845 to 1847. She then was in the Black Sea for the Russian War followed by the Second Opium War with China. She was sold for breaking in July 1864.

Inflexible was the third vessel to carry this name since it was used for an 18-gun sloop, launched by St John's at Lake Champlain on 1 October 1776 and whose fate is unknown.

Construction
She was ordered on 18 March 1841 from Pembroke Dockyard though her keel was not laid until January 1844. She was launched on 22 May 1845. Following her launch she was towed to Liverpool to have her boilers and machinery fitted. She was then towed to Devonport and was completed for sea on 9 August 1846 at an initial cost of £50,114 including the hull at £22,338, machinery at £18,458 and fitting at £9,418.

Commissioned service

First Commission
She was commissioned on 10 June 1846 under the command of Commander John Cochrane Hoseason, RN for service on the East Indies and China Station. She took part in the final year of the New Zealand War of 1845 to 1847. On 30 May 1849 she was in action against Chinese pirate junks at Lemma Island. On 12 July 1850 Commander Peche Hart Dyke, RN took command. By December 1851 she was on the North America and West Indies Station and in June 1852 had joined the Channel Squadron. On 13 July she had been assigned to particular service under the command of Commander George Rhodes Wolridge, RN. By June 1853 she had been assigned to the Mediterranean.

Second Commission
She recommissioned in July 1853 under the command of Commander George Otway Popplewell, RN for service in the Mediterranean and the Black Sea. She was involved in the attack on Fort Nicoaiev on 4 October 1854. She was paid off on 15 August 1855.

Third Commission
She was commissioned on 28 July 1856 for service on the East Indies and China Station under the command of Commander John Corbett, RN. she was in action with boats at Fatshan on 1 June 1857. on 15 August she came under the command of Commander George Augustus Cooke Brooker, RN. She participated in the destruction of pirate junks at Coulan in August and September 1858. She returned to home waters and paid off on 27 April 1861.

Disposition
She was sold to Castle & Beech in July 1864 then towed from Portsmouth on 8 September 1864 to Charlton for breaking.

Notes

Citations

References
 Lyon Winfield, The Sail & Steam Navy List, All the Ships of the Royal Navy 1815 to 1889, by David Lyon & Rif Winfield, published by Chatham Publishing, London © 2004, 
 Winfield, British Warships in the Age of Sail (1817 – 1863), by Rif Winfield, published by Seaforth Publishing, England © 2014, e, Chapter 11 Steam Paddle Vessels, Vessels acquired since November 1830, Stromboli Class
 Colledge, Ships of the Royal Navy, by J.J. Colledge, revised and updated by Lt Cdr Ben Warlow and Steve Bush, published by Seaforth Publishing, Barnsley, Great Britain, © 2020, e  (EPUB)
 The New Navy List, conducted by Joseph Allen, Esq., RN, London: Parker, Furnivall, and Parker, Military Library, Whitehall, MDCCCXLVII
 The Navy List, published by His Majesty's Stationery Office, London

Paddle sloops of the Royal Navy
Sloop classes